Major Ramaswamy Parameswaran, PVC (13 September 1946, Mumbai – 25 November 1987, Sri Lanka), Parry to his colleagues, was an Officer of the Indian Army who was awarded the Param Vir Chakra, India's highest military decoration, for his bravery.

Career
Parameshwaran was granted a Short Service Commission as a second lieutenant in the 15th Battalion Mahar Regiment on 16 January 1972. Promoted lieutenant on 16 January 1974, he was subsequently granted a regular commission, and was promoted captain on 12 October 1979 and to major on 31 July 1984.

Military action

On 25 November 1987, when Major Ramaswamy Parameswaran was returning from search operation in Sri Lanka, late at night, his column was ambushed by a group of militants which had five rifles. With a cool presence of mind, he encircled the militants from the rear and charged into them, taking them completely by surprise. During the hand-to-hand combat, a militant shot him in the chest. Undaunted, Major Parameswaran snatched the rifle from the militant and shot him dead. Gravely wounded, he continued to give orders and inspired his command till he died. Five militants were killed and three rifles and two rocket launchers were recovered and the ambush was cleared .

Param Vir Chakra citation
The Param Vir Chakra citation on the Official Indian Army Website reads as follows:

IPKF Memorial error
On 15 August 2012, R.K. Radhakrishnan, Colombo correspondent of The Hindu reported a glaring error on the IPKF transcription :

"The inscription read: IC 32907F MAJ. P.RAMASWAMY MVC 25 NOV 1987 8 MAHAR.
MVC stands for Maha Vir Chakra, India's second highest military decoration. No one seemed to have noticed the mistake before. As I stood there, it crossed my mind that there was no guarantee that the names and honours of the other 1200 soldiers inscribed on the stone were all correct. Since Independence, only 21 Indians have had the honour of having PVC suffixed to their names. Parameshwaran was the only IPKF soldier who was given that honour. He is also the lone Mahar Regiment soldier to be conferred the PVC, the highest military decoration of India. That must mean a lot to a regiment active since 1941."

Naming of an apartment  
The Army welfare housing board built a colony in Arcot Road Chennai and named it as A.W.H.O Parameshwaran Vihar in the year 1998 in honor of Major Ramaswamy Parameswaran.

See also
Indian Army
Param Vir Chakra

References

External links
 Jai Hind Jai Bharat

Indian Army personnel
Recipients of the Param Vir Chakra
1946 births
1987 deaths
Indian military personnel killed in action
Military personnel from Mumbai